The Air Force Falcons men's basketball team represents the United States Air Force Academy, located in Colorado Springs, Colorado, in NCAA Division I basketball competition. They play their home games at the Clune Arena and are members of the Mountain West Conference.

Postseason

NCAA tournament results
The Falcons have appeared in four NCAA Tournaments, with a combined record of 0–4.

NIT results
The Falcons have appeared in one National Invitation Tournament, with a record of 3–1.

CIT results
The Falcons have appeared in two CollegeInsider.com Tournaments, with a combined record of 2–2.

Notable former players
Notable alumni include:
Jared Dillinger: Current TNT KaTropa and Meralco Bolts PBA Player
Gregg Popovich: Current San Antonio Spurs Head Coach
Rodney Tention: Later coach at Loyola Marymount (2005–08)
Bob Djokovich & Thomas Schneeberger: founder of the USAFA Team Handball and Olympians.

Trivia
The team attended the 1976 USA Team Handball Nationals and became second in the adults and collegiate division.

After the nationals Bob Djokovich and Thomas Schneeberger founded USAFA Team Handball.

References

External links